TiMidity++, originally and still frequently informally called TiMidity, is a software synthesizer that can play MIDI files without a hardware synthesizer. It can either render to the sound card in real time, or it can save the result to a file, such as a PCM .wav file.

TiMidity++ primarily runs under Linux and Unix-like operating systems, but it also runs under Microsoft Windows and AmigaOS. Distributed under the GPL-2.0-or-later, TiMidity++ is free software.

Features

TiMidity++ can read a number of file types and devices, primarily the ordinary .mid files, but also .kar (MIDI with Karaoke lyrics), Recomposer files, and module files. It is one of the few programs that can read MIDI .mid files using the MIDI Tuning Standard. TiMidity++ also has support for SoundFonts, rendering the synthesized MIDI sounds into their recorded SoundFont equivalents and directing the output to the soundcard. Files can be fetched from standard input, files, archive files, or from the network (over HTTP, FTP or NNTP).

The program has various interfaces, including but not limited to bare text, ncurses, X11 (Motif, Xaw, GTK+ and Tk) and even an Emacs interface that shows played notes in real time.

TiMidity++ has some support for microtonal music.

History

The original version of TiMidity was written in 1995 by Tuukka Toivonen. After he stopped updating the program, Masanao Izumo and other contributors started to work on the program, renaming it to TiMidity++.

See also

 FluidSynth
 WildMIDI

References
Citations

Bibliography

External links
 TiMidity++ home page

Free audio software
Free software programmed in C
Software synthesizers for Linux
Open source software synthesizers
Audio software that uses GTK
Software that uses Tk (software)
Software that uses ncurses